Systofte Skovby is a village  east of Nykøbing on the Danish island of Falster. Today it serves as a satellite village for Nykøbing. As of 2022, it has a population of 338.

History
Portions of the old nave and chancel of Systofte Church indicate that it was originally built in the Late Romanesque period. Under Bishop Jens Andersen Beldenak in the early 16th century, the Crown enjoyed jus vocandi rights for the appointment of clergy. In 1832 it came under the administration of Orupgaard but obtained independent ownership in 1940.

References

Falster
Cities and towns in Region Zealand
Guldborgsund Municipality